Andrea Petkovic was the defending champion, but she chose not to participate this year.
Samantha Stosur won the title, defeating Karin Knapp in the final, 3–6, 7–6(7–3), 6–2.

Seeds

Draw

Finals

Top half

Bottom half

Qualifying

Seeds

Qualifiers

Lucky losers

Draw

First qualifier

Second qualifier

Third qualifier

Fourth qualifier

Fifth qualifier

Sixth qualifier

References 
 Main draw
 Qualifying draw

Gastein Ladies - Singles
2015 Singles
Gast
Gast